Krcmar, Krčmář (Czech), Krčmářová (Czech feminine), or Krčmar (Serbo-Croatian) is a surname. Notable people with the surname include:
 Boris Krčmar (born 1979), Croatian darts player
 Daniel Krčmář (born 1971), Slovak biathlete
 Gabriela Krčmářová (born 1978), Czech gymnast
 Helmut Krcmar (born 1954), German academic
 Michal Krčmář (born 1991), Czech biathlete

See also
 

Czech-language surnames
Croatian surnames
Slovak-language surnames
Occupational surnames